Filippo Fortin (born 1 February 1989 in Venice) is an Italian professional road and track cyclist, who currently rides for UCI Continental team .

Major results

2007
 1st  Team pursuit, National Junior Track Championships (with Elia Viviani, Mario Sgrinzato and Mirko Tedeschi)
2009
 8th Trofeo Alcide Degasperi
2011
 1st  Team pursuit, National Track Championships (with Omar Bertazzo, Giairo Ermeti and Alessandro De Marchi)
 1st Stage 4 Vuelta Ciclista de Chile
 6th Road race, UCI Under-23 Road World Championships
2012
 8th Classic Loire Atlantique
 9th Dwars door Drenthe
2015
 1st Stage 1 Okolo Slovenska
 2nd GP Adria Mobil
 2nd Croatia–Slovenia
2016
 1st GP Adria Mobil
 1st Belgrade–Banja Luka II
 Tour de Serbie
1st  Points classification
1st Stages 1 & 5
 3rd Trofej Umag
 7th GP Izola
 8th Trofeo Felanitx-Ses Salines-Campos-Porreres
 9th Belgrade–Banja Luka I
2017
 1st GP Izola
 1st Tour de Berne
 1st Stage 1 CCC Tour-Grody Piastowskie
 Flèche du Sud
1st  Points classification
1st Stage 1
 1st Stage 1 Oberösterreich Rundfahrt
 2nd Trofej Umag
2018
 1st GP Adria Mobil
 1st Stage 2 Flèche du Sud
 1st Stage 4 Szlakiem Walk Majora Hubala
 1st Stage 2 Oberösterreich Rundfahrt
 1st Stage 4 Czech Cycling Tour
 2nd La Popolarissima
 3rd Croatia–Slovenia
 7th Overall Rhône-Alpes Isère Tour
1st Stage 2
 8th GP Laguna
 10th Poreč Trophy
2019
 9th Tacx Pro Classic
2020
 2nd GP Antalya
 2nd GP Kranj
 5th Grand Prix Alanya
 6th Overall Dookoła Mazowsza
2021
 1st Stage 1 Istrian Spring Trophy
 2nd Trofej Umag
 5th Poreč Trophy
2022
 1st Stage 2 Belgrade Banjaluka
 5th Circuito del Porto
 9th Umag Trophy
 9th Poreč Trophy

References

External links

1989 births
Living people
Italian male cyclists
Sportspeople from Venice
Cyclists from the Metropolitan City of Venice
21st-century Italian people